Patrik Poulíček (born June 10, 1993) is a Czech professional ice hockey player. He currently plays with HC Pardubice of the Czech Extraliga.

Poulíček made his Czech Extraliga debut playing with HC Pardubice during the 2013–14 Czech Extraliga season.

References

External links

1993 births
Living people
Czech ice hockey forwards
HC Dynamo Pardubice players
Competitors at the 2013 Winter Universiade
LHK Jestřábi Prostějov players
Sportspeople from Havlíčkův Brod
HC Slovan Ústečtí Lvi players